Brendon Smith (born 4 July 2000) is an Australian swimmer. He won the bronze medal in the 400 metre individual medley at the 2020 Summer Olympics and has competed in the Summer Universiade and the 2021 Australian Swimming Trials.

Background
Smith trained with the Nunawading Swimming Club in Melbourne's Eastern Suburbs until 2022. In 2018 he was named by SwimSwam as one of the "20 Australians Under 20 You Need to be Watching" in the men's category. In 2022, Smith left his swim club in Nunawading and began training with Michael Bohl at Griffith University.

Smith is a student at La Trobe University, studying a Bachelor of Business in Accounting and Finance.

Smith is a lifesaver at the Half Moon Bay SLSC in Black Rock, Victoria. He competed at the Australian Youth Lifesaving Team at the 2018 Lifesaving World Championships. Smith was the only Victorian on the team. He broke two records and took home five medals, including a win in the men's 17-18 200m Obstacle Race.

Career
He competed at the 2018 Junior Pan Pacific Swimming Championships in the 200 metre, 400 metre, and 800 metre freestyle events and the 200 metre individual medley, winning the silver medal in the 400 metre freestyle with a time of 3:52.67. A year later in 2019, Smith competed at the 2019 Summer Universiade in Naples, Italy in the 200 metre breaststroke, 800 metre freestyle and 400 metre individual medley and won the bronze medal in the  freestyle relay alongside Maxwell Carleton, Ashton Brinkworth, Jacob Hansford and Cameron Tysoe.

2021 Summer Olympics Trials
Smith competed at the 2021 Australian Swimming Trials in the 200 metre, 800 metre, and 1500 metre freestyle events as well as both the 200 metre and 400 metre individual medley events. He qualified for the Australian Olympic swim team after achieving an Australian record in the 400 metre individual medley final with a time of 4:10.04, surpassing the previous record set by Thomas Fraser-Holmes at the 2013 Australian Swimming Championships with a time of 4:10.14.

2020 Summer Olympics

At the 2020 Summer Olympics in Tokyo, Japan, and held in 2021 due to the COVID-19 pandemic, Smith broke both the Australian and Commonwealth record in the 400 metre individual medley with a time of 4.09.27 in the prelims heats. In the final, he won a bronze medal in the event with a time of 4:10.38, which was 0.10 seconds slower than silver medalist in the event Jay Litherland of the United States, less than one second slower than the gold medalist in the event Chase Kalisz of the United States, and marked Australia's first medal at the 2020 Olympic Games.

See also
 Chronological summary of the 2020 Summer Olympics

References

External links
 
 
 
 
 

2000 births
Australian male medley swimmers
Living people
Australian male freestyle swimmers
Swimmers from Melbourne
Olympic bronze medalists for Australia
Olympic bronze medalists in swimming
Medalists at the 2020 Summer Olympics
Swimmers at the 2020 Summer Olympics
Olympic swimmers of Australia
Universiade medalists in swimming
World Aquatics Championships medalists in swimming
Medalists at the FINA World Swimming Championships (25 m)
Swimmers at the 2022 Commonwealth Games
Commonwealth Games medallists in swimming
Commonwealth Games silver medallists for Australia
21st-century Australian people
Sportsmen from Victoria (Australia)
Universiade bronze medalists for Australia
Medalists at the 2019 Summer Universiade
Medallists at the 2022 Commonwealth Games